Marine Partaud (born 9 November 1994) is a French professional tennis player.

She has career-high WTA rankings of 371 in singles, attained on 18 July 2022, and of 301 in doubles, attained on 21 February 2022. Partaud has won four singles titles and eleven doubles titles on tournaments of the ITF Circuit.

Career
Partaud made her Grand Slam women's doubles debut at the 2017 French Open, where she and her partner Virginie Razzano entered the event as a wildcard and lost in the first round to the Australian pair of Ashleigh Barty and Casey Dellacqua.

ITF Circuit finals

Singles: 9 (4 titles, 5 runner–ups)

Doubles: 19 (11 titles, 8 runner–ups)

Notes

References

External links
 
 

1994 births
Living people
French female tennis players
Sportspeople from Poitiers
21st-century French women